is a former Japanese football player.

Club statistics

References

External links

1987 births
Living people
Association football people from Fukuoka Prefecture
Japanese footballers
J1 League players
J2 League players
Shimizu S-Pulse players
Shonan Bellmare players
Association football defenders